Brigadier-General Lindiwe Ngwenya is an officer of the Zimbabwe National Army.

Lindiwe Ngwenya was promoted to the rank of brigadier-general on 18 December 2015.  She became the second general officer in the Zimbabwe National Army (after Shylet Moyo).

References 

Zimbabwean generals
Living people
Female army generals
Year of birth missing (living people)